Cadavere a spasso is a 1965 Italian comedy film directed by Marco Masi.

Cast
Pietro De Vico ...  Nicolino
Heidi Stroh ...  Patrizia (as Heidy Stroh)
Marisa Sally ...  Serena
Tiberio Murgia
Enrico Pozzi
Giuseppe Ricagno
Fabio Battistini
Luigi Batzella
Conny Caracciolo

External links
 

1965 films
1960s Italian-language films
1965 comedy films
Italian comedy films
1960s Italian films